A popular assembly (or people's assembly) is a gathering called to address issues of importance to participants. Assemblies tend to be freely open to participation and operate by direct democracy.  Some assemblies are of people from a location, some from a given workplace, industry or educational establishment others are called to address a specific issue.

The term is often used to describe gatherings that address, what participants feel are, the effects of a democratic deficit in representative democratic systems. Sometimes assemblies are created to form an alternative power structure, other times they work with other forms of government.

As a government

Athens 
In Athenian democracy the Ecclesia was the assembly of all male citizens.

New England 
The town meeting is the traditional governing body of the New England town, which in its traditional form is open to all adult residents to discuss and vote on the major issues of town government. It was founded in the colonial era as an outgrowth of church meetings, which then became secularized as a purely governmental meeting. Although larger towns have since moved to more representative forms of government, it is still widely practiced in smaller and more rural communities.

The similarly named town hall meeting, where politicians meet with their constituents and discuss issues, is named after and meant to resemble the town meeting.

Mexico 

At a local level, people attend a popular assembly of around 300 families in which anyone over the age of 12 can participate in decision-making. These assemblies strive to reach a consensus, but are willing to fall back to a majority vote. The communities form a federation with other communities to create an autonomous municipality, which form further federations with other municipalities to create a region. The Zapatistas are composed of five regions, in total having a population of around 360,000 people as of 2018.

Syria 

The autonomous region is ruled by a coalition which bases its policy ambitions to a large extent on democratic libertarian socialist ideology of democratic confederalism and have been described as pursuing a model of economy that blends co-operative and market enterprise, through a system of popular assemblies in minority, cultural and religious representation. The AANES has by far the highest average salaries and standard of living throughout Syria, with salaries being twice as large as in regime-controlled Syria; following the collapse of the Syrian pound the AANES doubled salaries to maintain inflation, and allow for good wages.

Examples
 Curiate Assembly
 Bolivarian Circles
 European Assembly for Climate Justice 2010
 Occupy movement 2011
 15M movement assemblies 2011–2015

Argentine economic crisis (1999–2002)
During the Argentine economic crisis (1999–2002) many Argentinian citizens started engaging and organising their actions through assemblies.

After closure, the Chilvert printing press was occupied by workers who organised through an assembly.  Within weeks of being reopened as a workers cooperative Chilvert printed a book called Que son las Asembleas Populares? or What are the Popular Assemblies?, a collection of articles written by renowned intellectuals , Stella Calloni and Rafael Bielsa as well as workers and participants in the assemblies.

As with other workplaces, the print factory was saved from closure by the actions of a popular assembly.  The military and police were blocked from entering the factory after the popular assembly of Pompeya called on barrio residents to protect the workplace.  Individual police officers expressed their support for the workers and the popular assembly and successfully petitioned the judge to rescind his order to seize the factory.

The assemblies movement is reported to have spiked in power rapidly and fallen from any major significance within months. It is reported that Grigera summing up his analysis of the asambleas states
no matter how progressive or "advanced" the social relationships, forms of decision-making and activities of asambleas are said to be, their small scale, lack of influence and flawed coordination between themselves and other movements render this movement unable to overcome very narrow limitations.

Cherán (2011–present) 
The town of Cherán in Mexico saw armed citizens kick out the corrupt police, drug cartels, and mayor in 2011. Since then they have adopted a system of popular assemblies to govern the town, which is somewhat independent of the central government.

See also
 Autonomism
 Anarchism
 Deliberative democracy
 Direct democracy
 Landsgemeinde
 Participatory democracy
 Referendum
 Spokescouncil
 Workers' council
 Workplace democracy

References

"Throw them all out" Argentina's grassroots rebellion|Roger Burbach|Spotlight|2 July 2002Debating the lessons of the Argentine Insurrection |Joe Craig|12 May 2006

External links
 Peoples Assemblies - resources, news and calendar
 Website for UK Education Assembly January 2011
 Website for the European Assembly for Climate Justice November 2010
 Via Campsenia - 1000 Cancuns
 The Barcelona Assembly
 The Popular Assembly of the Peoples of Oaxaca
 Map of Canadian Peoples Assemblies on Climate Justice December 2010
 Popular Assemblies and the Growing Popular Assembly Movement - commentary from Oaxaca by Nancy Davies 4 January 2007

 Spotlight|Throw the bums out- Argentines seek break from begging loans|Roger Burbach|28 February 2002
 Spotlight|The abyss in Argentina|by Roger Burbach|5 May 2002
Popular Assemblies in Revolts and Revolutions
Occupy Movement, the Zapatista's and the General Assemblies
 Beyond Resistance - Fight the Cuts build Peoples Assemblies by Gerry Gold & Paul Feldman|2010
 Methods to make assemblies and meetings effective, participatory and enjoyable|Collaborative document|
 Connect with Occupy activists and community organizers who are coordinating trainings across the United States to build Popular Assemblies

Videos
 Video of The People's Assembly during COP15 outside the Bella Centre, Copenhagen - 16 December 2009
 Peoples Assemblies Video by Dylan Strain

Meetings
Local government in the United States